Hopkins West Junior High School is a junior high school located in Minnetonka, Minnesota, USA. In 2007-08 it educated around 900 students in grades seven to nine. The school is managed by the Hopkins Public Schools district.

Hopkins West was awarded the Blue Ribbon School of Excellence in 1983-84. It was the first middle school in Minnesota to receive this honor. The National Association of Secondary School Principals, in 2004, included Hopkins West as one of the '100 Highly Effective Middle Level Schools' in the nation.

The Knowledge Master Open team was the national junior high quiz champions in the Knowledge Master Open for fall 2008.

Currently, the principal of the school is Leanne Kampfe, PhD.

References

External links 
 

Public middle schools in Minnesota
Minnetonka, Minnesota
Schools in Hennepin County, Minnesota